The Shanghai clique, also referred to as the Shanghai gang, Jiang clique, or Jiang faction, refers to an informal group of Chinese Communist Party (CCP) officials who rose to prominence under former CCP General Secretary Jiang Zemin while he served as the party chief and mayor of Shanghai.

Chinese politics have long been defined by the competition between intra-party factions' ability to place key members and allies in positions of power within the CCP and Chinese government. In the 1990s when Jiang Zemin was the CCP General Secretary, Chinese politics was dominated by the Shanghai gang as Jiang attempted to place cultivated ideological followers in senior positions within the government. Under Hu Jintao, the Shanghai gang balanced Hu's Chinese Communist Youth League (CCYL) faction in government and under Xi Jinping, the Shanghai gang continues to contend with Xi's faction wherein both factions attempt to obtain the political upper-hand through the nomination of chosen officials to senior roles.

History

Origins 
Outside mainland China, after Hu Jintao became general secretary of the CCP Central Committee in 2002, there have been many commentary books on the relationship between the Shanghai Gang and the central government headed by Hu at that time. It is still taboo to talk about within the mainland. In the Political Bureau of the CCP Central Committee elected by the 16th and 17th CCP National Congresses, the "Shanghai Gang" occupied several positions on the Standing Committee of the Political Bureau of the CCP Central Committee. Jiang Zemin himself also continued to serve as the chairman of the CCP Central Military Commission after Hu Jintao became the general secretary of the CCP Central Committee. In 2004, he resigned as Chairman of the Military Commission at the Fourth Plenary Session of the 16th Central Committee of the Chinese Communist Party on September 19, 2004, but still retained his office of the Chairman of the Military Commission until the 18th National Congress of the Chinese Communist Party in 2012.

Jiang's retirement 

Upon Jiang's retirement in 2004, it was widely believed that he stuffed the Politburo Standing Committee with his 'own men', and was making it difficult for Hu Jintao and Wen Jiabao to carry out their own policies. Evidence for this theory included the 5th Plenary Meeting of 16th National Congress of the Chinese Communist Party, when Hu's efforts to reshuffle the Politburo was blocked by members of the Shanghai Clique. Wen's macro-economic measures aimed at slowing down infrastructure growth and nationwide overheating in the property sector received great resistance from alleged members of this clique until the fall of Chen Liangyu in September 2006.

However, as Jiang had retired from all of his positions at the 4th Plenary Meeting of 16th National Congress of the CCP, Hu Jintao became the legitimate Paramount leader. There were signs of important members of the Shanghai Clique defecting to Hu's camp, thereby strengthening Hu's position. In addition, in a bold move in September 2006, Hu acted to purge prominent rival Chen Liangyu, former Chinese Communist Party Committee Secretary and Mayor of Shanghai, for alleged corruption, thus strengthening his position both within the party and in China. Follow the death of Huang Ju and retirement of Zeng Qinghong in 2007, the Shanghai clique was no longer as powerful as before after the 17th Party Congress.

After Hu left office in 2012, the influence of the Shanghai clique was no longer a visible feature of the Chinese political landscape. Some of the inner members of Shanghai clique including Zhou Yongkang and Guo Boxiong were being prosecuted under the anti-corruption started after the 18th Party Congress leading by Xi Jinping and Wang Qishan. China Leadership Monitor, which calls the group the "Shanghai Gang", has identified Han Zheng and Wang Huning (who both joined the Politburo Standing Committee in 2017) as members.

Under Hu Jintao 
On September 24, 2006, Chen Liangyu, secretary of the CCP Shanghai Municipal Committee, who was an important member of the Shanghai Gang, was dismissed for his involvement in the Shanghai Social Security Fund case; overseas media pointed out that this was the "(Communist Youth) Youth League, headed by Hu Jintao, then General Secretary of the CCP Central Committee. Faction's campaign against the Shanghai Gang in the name of anti-corruption led to the resignation of Chen Liangyu. After Chen Liangyu stepped down, Xi Jinping, then secretary of the Zhejiang Provincial Party Committee of the Chinese Communist Party, was transferred to Shanghai in March 2007 to serve as the secretary of the Municipal Party Committee, becoming the first municipal Party secretary to be parachuted from other places since 1985.

On June 2, 2007, Huang Ju, then a member of the Standing Committee of the Political Bureau of the CCP Central Committee and Vice Premier of the State Council, passed away, which was another important blow to the Shanghai Gang. Faguang quoted Taiwan's Central News Agency as saying that Huang Ju was an important member of the Shanghai Gang, whose "disappearance" was full of political connotations, and was regarded as an important indicator to observe the current CCP General Secretary Hu Jintao and his predecessor Jiang Zemin's strength. Huang Ju's wife, Yu Huiwen, was accused of illegally using billions of yuan in Shanghai social security funds. Less than two months after Huang Ju's death, Wang Weigong, deputy general manager of Shanghai Shenergy Group, who had served as Huang Ju's secretary, was also arrested for his involvement in the Shanghai Social Security Fund case.

On October 15, 2007, the 17th National Congress of the Chinese Communist Party was held. After that, Zeng Qinghong, who was considered to be the core figure of the Shanghai Gang, retired, and Li Keqiang, the former first secretary of the Communist Youth League Central Committee, joined the Standing Committee of the Political Bureau of the Central Committee of the Chinese Communist Party, marking the beginning of the Youth League faction.

In 2011, Commonwealth magazine stated that the power struggle between the central government of the Chinese Communist Party controlled by Hu Jintao and Wen Jiabao and the local forces in Shanghai led by Jiang Zemin had worsened because the Shanghai Gang advocated that economic development in coastal areas should not be affected by overemphasizing the development of rural areas.

Under Xi Jinping 

In November 2012, Xi Jinping took over as General Secretary of the CCP Central Committee, and Wu Bangguo, Jia Qinglin, Li Changchun and Zhou Yongkang, who were regarded as important members of the Shanghai Gang among the 17th Central Political Bureau Standing Committee, retired after the 18th CCP National Congress. Among the newly elected members of the Politburo Standing Committee of the 18th Central Committee, the Jiang faction is still considered to have the majority. However, after Xi Jinping and Wang Qishan launched an anti-corruption campaign after the 18th National Congress of the Chinese Communist Party, many Jiang faction officials were sacked in this anti-corruption campaign, including Zhou Yongkang, the former secretary of the Political and Legal Committee of the Central Committee of the Chinese Communist Party, Guo Boxiong and Guo Boxiong, the former vice chairman of the Central Military Commission of the Chinese Communist Party. Xu Caihou and others.

2014 Investigations in Shanghai 
According to a BBC report, on July 29, 2014, after Zhou Yongkang was announced to be under investigation, the Central Inspection Team was stationed in Shanghai. Zhou Yongkang, a former member of the Standing Committee of the Political Bureau of the CCP Central Committee, is regarded as Jiang Zemin's confidant, and Shanghai is Jiang Zemin's base. After the central inspection team arrived in Shanghai, Wang Zongnan, the former chairman of Shanghai Bright Food Group, was put on file. Wang Zongnan was one of Jiang Zemin's confidants. Zhou Yongkang is the target of Xi Jinping's anti-corruption campaign. On August 1, 2014, the Liberty Times quoted the Financial Times as saying that Jiang Zemin, who was 87 years old at the time, had stepped down as General Secretary of the CCP Central Committee after the 16th National Congress of the Chinese Communist Party in 2002 and resigned from the Political Bureau of the CCP Central Committee. The gang” still retains huge influence within the party. Four or five of the seven standing members of the Political Bureau of the CCP Central Committee are members of the Jiang faction. The current general secretary Xi Jinping’s anti-corruption campaign will turn to Jiang Zemin’s stronghold, the Shanghai Gang. The inspection team of the Central Commission for Discipline Inspection was stationed in Shanghai, and people with knowledge of the matter told the Financial Times that Jiang Zemin’s influence in the party and the military had angered Xi, and the anti-corruption investigation had targeted many of Jiang Zemin’s associates, including Xu Caihou, the former vice chairman of the Central Military Commission, who served as Wang Zongnan, chairman of Bright Food Group, was also investigated on suspicion of embezzling public funds and accepting bribes. On October 29, 2014, Zhang Wenyue, head of the second inspection team of the Central Committee, reported to Han Zheng, Secretary of the Shanghai Municipal Committee of the Chinese Communist Party, the problems existing in Shanghai's officialdom, and handed over some leading cadres' clues to the Central Commission for Discipline Inspection and the Central Organization Department and other departments.

19th National Congress 

In October 2017, the 19th National Congress of the Chinese Communist Party was held. Among the members of the Standing Committee of the Political Bureau of the 18th Central Committee, Zhang Dejiang, Liu Yunshan, Zhang Gaoli, who were regarded as members of the Jiang faction, and Yu Zhengsheng, a former secretary of the Shanghai Municipal Party Committee, and Guo Boxiong, who were regarded as important members of the Jiang faction. Fan Changlong, the vice chairman of the Central Military Commission, all retired after the 19th National Congress of the Chinese Communist Party. Han Zheng, who was the last member of the Standing Committee of the Political Bureau of the 19th CCP Central Committee, was regarded by some as a member of the Shanghai Gang. Li Qiang and Ying Yong, Xi Jinping's former ministries in Zhejiang, broke the convention that since 1991, all the mayors of Shanghai have been local officials.

2020 Investigations in Shanghai 
From October to December 2020, the sixth round of inspections of the 19th Central Committee was officially launched, and the fourth inspection team of the Central Committee will visit Shanghai again after a lapse of six years. On February 3, 2021, Zhao Fengtong, the leader of the Fourth Inspection Team of the Central Committee, reported to Li Qiang, Secretary of the CCP Shanghai Municipal Committee, the problems existing in Shanghai's officialdom, and handed over the clues of some leading cadres to the Central Commission for Discipline Inspection and the Central Organization Department.

Membership
Important people who have been identified as belonging to the clique include incumbent standing members of the powerful Politburo of the CCP Central Committee. Members of the Shanghai clique are marked by their tendency to represent urban business interests of the coastal regions, many of them princelings, the children of revolutionary veterans, and their expertise in commercial affairs.

Inner circle 
The following individuals owe part of their career advancement to personal support from Jiang. They are listed in rough order of how often they are associated as being part of Jiang's inner circle:
Li Changchun
Zhou Yongkang
Zhang Dejiang
Liu Yunshan
Zhang Gaoli
Yang Xiong
Han Zheng
Zeng Peiyan
Hui Liangyu
Liu Qi
Hua Jianmin
Wu Guanzheng

Clique 
These people have been commonly identified as members of the Shanghai clique:
Jiang Zemin, former General Secretary of the Communist Party
Wu Bangguo
Huang Ju
Zeng Qinghong
Jia Qinglin
Chen Liangyu
Chen Zhili
Jia Ting'an

Meng Jianzhu, successor of Zhou Yongkang, also served in prominent positions in Shanghai, however they are not closely associated with Jiang and thus are usually not named as part of the Shanghai clique. Likewise, Premier Zhu Rongji, while having climbed through the ranks in Shanghai, was not necessarily associated with Jiang personally.

See also

 Politics of China
 Tuanpai
 Qinghua clique

References

History of Shanghai
Factions of the Chinese Communist Party